Graham Wright (born 6 June 1968) is a former Australian rules footballer, who played for  in the Australian Football League.

Playing career
Wright was selected by Collingwood in the 1987 National draft with their first round pick (no.3 overall) as a quick wingman, having shown great courage for Tasmanian side East Devonport. Making his debut in 1988, Wright took his time to prove his value as a first-round draftee but in 1990 he had a fantastic year which saw him rise in ranking amongst the top wingmen in the league. Wright finished 2nd in the Brownlow Medal to Tony Liberatore by one vote in 1990, and would then finish equal 3rd in the Copeland Trophy. Perhaps more importantly, Wright was a valuable member of the 1990 premiership side. Wright would also represent Tasmania in State football.

A shock came to coach Leigh Matthews and players at the end of 1991 when Wright announced he wanted to return to Tasmania to play football, but was talked out of it by Matthews. In 1993 he was a victim of a disease which threatened his playing career, but he recovered in the pre-season to continue playing his damaging football on the wing. Consistent football followed in the mid-1990s before suffering a knee injury in 1996 against Richmond where he would require a knee reconstruction. Following the season-ending injury, his main asset of pace was severely affected, and would play out his career in defence where his courage gave him an edge. Wright played his 200th game against Carlton in 1998, before retiring a week later at the end of the 1998 season.

Recruitment management
Wright had experience in recruitment at both Brisbane (2004-2007) and Hawthorn (since 2007). He also has an MBA in Sports Management.

When Hawthorn needed to reconstruct its team in recent years of the diluted drafts and then free agency. Wright was the man to find the players – teenagers and veterans who arrived to build the side. Wright was the person responsible for bringing Shaun Burgoyne, David Hale, Josh Gibson, Jack Gunston, Jonathan Simpkin and Brian Lake to the club and ultimately the 2013 to 2015 premierships.

References

External links

1968 births
Living people
Australian rules footballers from Tasmania
Collingwood Football Club players
Collingwood Football Club Premiership players
East Devonport Football Club players
Tasmanian State of Origin players
Casey Demons coaches
Tasmanian Football Hall of Fame inductees
People from Devonport, Tasmania
Allies State of Origin players
Victorian State of Origin players
Burnie Dockers Football Club players
One-time VFL/AFL Premiership players